For All You've Done is the thirteenth album in the live praise and worship series of contemporary worship music by Hillsong Church. The live album was released on 4 July 2004 on Hillsong label, which peaked at No. 1 on the ARIA Albums Chart. It had been recorded in February of that year at the Sydney Entertainment Centre with production by Darlene Zschech, Raymond Badham, Joel Houston and Reuben Morgan.

Recording

For All You've Done was recorded live at the Sydney Entertainment Centre on 29 February 2004 by Darlene Zschech and the Hillsong team.

Commercial performance
However, its previous two albums debuted in the top five due to the strong following of Hillsong and its previous 12 albums have achieved gold status. It is the first Christian Contemporary music album to reach the top of the Australian charts.

There was some controversy about the No. 1 debut as almost all of the albums were sold at the annual Hillsong Conference from 5 to 9 July. However, the Australian Recording Industry Association (ARIA) has defended the outcome on the grounds that For All You've Done was the best selling album in Australia that week. Pop singer and former Australian Idol contestant Paulini Curuenavuli was also at the conference promoting her No. 2 single, "Angel Eyes", from her forthcoming album, One Determined Heart.

Track listing

CD

Disc 1
 "For All You've Done" (Reuben Morgan) - Worship Leaders: Darlene Zschech & Reuben Morgan - 5:26
 "One Way" (Jonathon Douglass & Joel Houston) Worship Leaders: Jonathon Douglass & Marty Sampson, b. Darlene Zschech - 3:43
 "Evermore" (Joel Houston) - Worship Leaders: Marty Sampson, b. Darlene Zschech - 5:02
 "With All I Am" (Reuben Morgan) - Worship Leaders: Darlene Zschech & Reuben Morgan - 7:23
 "Sing (Your Love)" (Reuben Morgan) - Worship Leader: Reuben Morgan, b. Darlene Zschech - 6:22
 "Hallelujah" (Marty Sampson & Jonas Myrin) - Worship Leaders: Jonas Myrin b. Darlene Zschech - 9:05
 "You Are Worthy" (Darlene Zschech) Worship Leader: Darlene Zschech - 6:15
 "Home" (Marty Sampson) - Worship Leader: Marty Sampson  - 4:58

Disc 2
 "Forever and a Day" (Raymond Badham) - Worship Leader: Darlene Zschech, b. Marty Sampson - 4:55
 "Jesus the Same" (Raymond Badham) - Worship Leader: Steve McPherson - 5:30
 "I Will Love" (Miriam Webster) - Worship Leader: Miriam Webster - 4:41
 "Take All of Me" (Marty Sampson) - Worship Leader: Marty Sampson, b. Darlene Zschech - 8:15
 "More Than Life" (Reuben Morgan) - Worship Leaders: Tulele Faletolu & Darlene Zschech - 8:52
 "Glorify Your Name" (Darlene Zschech & David Holmes) - Worship Leader: Darlene Zschech - 7:02
 "To You Alone" (Reuben Morgan) - Worship Leaders: Holly Dawson & Darlene Zschech - 7:39

DVD
 "Intro"/"For All You've Done"
 "One Way"    
 "Evermore"
 "With All I Am"
 "Sing (Your Love)"
 "Hallelujah"
 "You Are Worthy"
 "Home"
 "Forever and a Day"
 "Jesus the Same"
 "I Will Love"
 "Take All of Me"
 "More Than Life"
 "Glorify Your Name"
 "To You Alone/Credits"
 "Resources"

b. indicates Lead Backing Vocal

Personnel
Adapted from AllMusic.

 Taijiro Adachi – assistant
 David Anderson – photography
 Ian Anderson – lighting
 Paul Andrew – vocals
 Nick Asha – engineer, post production engineer
 Ruth Athanasio – choir conductor
 Raymond Badham –  acoustic guitar, music direction, producer
 Sonja Bailey – percussion
 John Barnett – engineer, post production engineer
 Don Bartley – mastering
 Damian Bassett – vocals
 Julie Bassett – vocals
 Marty Beaton – guitar technician, keyboard technician, piano technician
 Marcüs Beaumont – electric guitar
 Trevor Beck – engineer, post production engineer, technical producer
 Monica Biegalke – project coordinator
 Josh Bonett – art direction, stage design
 Ashley Byron – stage manager
 Brent Clark – mixing
 Andrew Crawford – technical director
 Erica Crocker – vocals
 Michael Cuthbertson – engineer
 Ned Davies – vocals
 Holly Dawson – vocals
 Timothy Dearmin – saxophone
 Tulele Faletolu – vocals
 Michael Farmer – drums
 Ian Fisher – bass
 Kylie Fisher – choir conductor
 Lucy Fisher – vocals
 Rolf Wam Fjell – drums
 Matthew Fordham – lighting assistant
 Joan Foster – stage manager
 Michelle Fragar – vocals
 Muchiri Gateri – assistant
 Craig Gower – keyboards, piano
 Peter Hart – vocals
 Scott Haslem – vocal producer, vocals
 Ian Hendrick – lighting assistant
 Nigel Hendroff – acoustic guitar, electric guitar
 Hillsong – primary artist
 Hillsong Church Worship and Creative Arts Team – arranger
 David Holmes –  acoustic guitar, electric guitar
 Matthew Hope – brass director, trumpet
 Justin Hopkins – drum technician
 Trent Hopkinson – trumpet
 Karen Horn – vocals
 Bobbie Houston – executive producer
 Brian Houston – executive producer
 Joel Houston –  producer
 Andrea Jackson – stage manager
 Peter James – keyboards
 John Kasinathan – trombone
 Peter D. Kelly – percussion
 Giles Lambert – design
 Stephanie Lambert – trumpet
 Cassandra Langton – event coordinator
 Garth Lazaro – vocals
 Jessica LeClerc – assistant
 Kevin Lee – keyboards, piano
 Natalie Locke – event coordinator
 Steve Luke – trombone
 Jamil Mannah – engineer, post production engineer
 Steve McPherson – vocal producer, vocals
 Rhonda Meyerowitz – event coordinator
 Reuben Morgan –  acoustic guitar, producer, vocals
 Tony Mott – photography
 Luke Munns – drums
 Alistair Munro – monitor engineer
 Jonas Myrin –  vocals
 Sam O'Donnell – drum technician
 Steve Ollis – choir conductor
 Katrina Peoples – assistant, vocals
 Woody Pierson – vocals
 Aran Puddle – project coordinator
 Brett Randall – engineer
 Natalie Rudder – choir conductor
 Marty Sampson – acoustic guitar, keyboards, piano, vocals
 Joanna Savage – vocals
 Lisa Seymour – stage manager
 Mike Short – bass technician
 Reuben Singleton – flute
 Heather Skaret – stage manager
 Andrew Sloan – choir conductor, vocals
 Amanda Sorenson – engineer, post production engineer
 Matt Tennikoff – bass
 Catherine Thambiratnam – event coordinator
 Tim Tickner – assistant
 Dee Uluirewa – vocals
 Elisha Vella – percussion
 Peter Wallis – engineer, post production engineer
 Vanessa Watson – assistant
 Kevin Watts – monitor engineer
 Miriam Webster –  vocal producer, vocals
 Martine Williams – choir conductor
 Darlene Zschech –  producer, vocal producer, worship leader

References 

2004 live albums
2004 video albums
Hillsong Music live albums
Hillsong Music video albums
Live video albums